The Egypt women's national under-18 and under-19 basketball team is a national basketball team of Egypt, governed by the Egyptian Basketball Federation.
It represents the country in international under-18 and under-19 (under age 18 and under age 19) women's basketball competitions.

See also
Egypt women's national basketball team
Egypt women's national under-17 basketball team
Egypt men's national under-19 basketball team

References

External links
Archived records of Egypt team participations

Basketball in Egypt
Basketball teams in Egypt
Women's national under-19 basketball teams
Basketball